Route 44 may refer to:

Route 44 (MTA Maryland), a bus route in Baltimore, Maryland and its suburbs
London Buses route 44
SEPTA Route 44, Philadelphia

See also
List of highways numbered 44

44